Elizabeth Ann McKinley  is a New Zealand academic and as of 2019 is a full professor at the University of Melbourne.

Academic career

After a 2003 PhD titled Brown Bodies, White Coats: Postcolonialism, Māori Women and Science at the University of Waikato, McKinley moved to the University of Auckland, rising to full professor and moving to the University of Melbourne.

In the 2015 Queen's Birthday Honours, McKinley was appointed an Officer of the New Zealand Order of Merit, for services to education and Māori.

Selected works 
 McKinley, Elizabeth. "Locating the global: Culture, language and science education for indigenous students." International journal of science Education 27, no. 2 (2005): 227–241.
 Mckinley, Elizabeth. "Postcolonialism, indigenous students, and science education." In Handbook of research on science education, pp. 213–240. Routledge, 2013.
 Carr, Malcolm, Clive McGee, Alister Jones, Elizabeth McKinley, Beverley Bell, Hugh Barr, and Tina Simpson. "The effects of curricula and assessment on pedagogical approaches and on educational outcomes." (2005).
 McKinley, Elizabeth, Pauline McPherson Waiti, and Beverley Bell. "Language, culture and science education." International Journal of Science Education 14, no. 5 (1992): 579–595.
 McKinley, Elizabeth. "Brown bodies, white coats: Postcolonialism, Maori women and science." Discourse: studies in the cultural politics of education 26, no. 4 (2005): 481–496.

Personal life 
McKinley is Māori of Ngāti Kahungunu ki Wairarapa and Ngāi Tahu descent.

References

External links
 
 

Living people
New Zealand women academics
Year of birth missing (living people)
University of Waikato alumni
Academic staff of the University of Auckland
Academic staff of the University of Melbourne
New Zealand educational theorists
New Zealand emigrants to Australia
Ngāi Tahu people
Ngāti Kahungunu people
Officers of the New Zealand Order of Merit
People educated at Kuranui College